The Air battle over Merklín was an air-to-air engagement between Czechoslovak and USAFE air units over the Czech village of Merklín, in the Bohemian Forest, on 10 March 1953. During the action Czech pilot Jaroslav Šrámek, flying a MiG-15 (from 5th Fighter Regiment, 2nd Squadron, Plzeň-Líně air base), shot down one of a pair of American F-84E Thunderjets (from 53rd Fighter Bomber Squadron, 36th Fighter-Bomber Wing). The American pilot, Lt. Warren G.Brown ejected from the aircraft, which crash-landed in German territory, approximately 35 kilometres (22 mi) from the border, and survived.

The aircraft crashed near Regensburg, Bavaria and the burnt out wreckage of the F-84 was recovered by American soldiers. The attack followed reports of other Czechoslovak aircraft over Bavarian territory. Brown, the pilot of the F-84, reported they were on a routine patrol along the border when they spotted two aircraft appear from the East, he was fired upon and bailed out after losing control.

Popular culture
Incident was an inspiration for 1973 Czechoslovak film High Blue Wall which depicts fictionalised version of the incident.

References

Sources 
 "Czech fighter pilot recalls Cold War dogfight" by Collin O'Connor. Radio Prague, 4 October 2004
 Souboj nad Železnou oponou (Duel Above The Iron Curtain), 2000 article by Tomáš Soušek  
 23 March 1953 article from Life Magazine, pages 29 – 31, (via Google Books)

Air-to-air combat operations and battles
20th-century aircraft shootdown incidents
Battles involving Czechoslovakia
Battles involving the United States
Battles and conflicts without fatalities
Cold War military history of the United States
Czechoslovakia–United States relations
1953 in Czechoslovakia
Military history of Czechoslovakia
Combat incidents
Conflicts in 1953
Aviation accidents and incidents in Czechoslovakia
March 1953 events in Europe